Caleb Femi (born 1990) is a British-Nigerian author, film-maker, photographer, and former young people's laureate for London. His debut poetry collection, Poor, was awarded a Forward Prize for Poetry.

Early life 
Femi was born in 1990 in Kano, Nigeria, where he was brought up by his grandmother. When he was seven years old, he moved to join his parents on the North Peckham Estate in London. After leaving school, he studied English at Queen Mary, University of London.

Career 
From 2014 to 2016 Femi taught English at a secondary school in Tottenham. In 2016 he was chosen as the first young people's laureate for London. On 30 July 2020, he published his debut poetry collection, entitled Poor, which won the Forward Prize's Felix Dennis Prize for Best First Collection in October 2021.

Filmography 
Femi has so far made and released four short films, serving as writer/director on each:

 And They Knew Light (2017)
 Wishbone (2018)
 Secret Life of Gs (2019)
 Survivor's Guilt (2020)

Accolades 
Femi was named in Dazed magazine's 2021 Dazed100, a list of the next generation shaping youth culture.

References

External links 
 Official website
 Caleb Femi on IMDb
 Bridget Minamore, "Get Up, Stand Up Now: Q&A with poet and director Charles Femi", Somerset House, 28 August 2019

1990 births
Black British filmmakers
Living people
Nigerian emigrants to the United Kingdom
Nigerian film directors
Nigerian photographers
Nigerian writers
People from Kano